The 1923 Queensland state election was held on 12 May 1923.

The National Party had reconstituted itself as the Queensland United Party since the previous election. The Northern Country Party had merged with the Country Party, but both its MPs had joined the United Party; seats won by the Northern Country Party in 1920 are listed below as United-held.

By-elections
 On 18 March 1922, Alfred Jones (Labor) was elected to succeed John Fihelly (Labor), who had resigned on 7 February 1922, as the member for Paddington.
 On 17 February 1923, George Farrell (Labor) was elected to succeed Frank Forde, who has resigned on 5 October 1922, as the member for Rockhampton.

Retiring Members
No MLAs retired at this election.

Candidates
Sitting members at the time of the election are shown in bold text.

See also
 1923 Queensland state election
 Members of the Queensland Legislative Assembly, 1920–1923
 Members of the Queensland Legislative Assembly, 1923–1926
 List of political parties in Australia

References
 

Candidates for Queensland state elections